The Sintra-Cascais Natural Park is a park on the Portuguese Riviera, one of the 13 Natural Parks of Portugal. While only established in 1994 as a Natural Park by the Portuguese Government, it has been protected since 1981. Its area is approximately 145 km2. The park includes the Serra de Sintra Mountain Range but extends all the way to the coast and Cabo da Roca, continental Europe's westernmost point. It contains the Castle of the Moors. Located within 25 km of Lisbon, the Sintra-Cascais Natural Park is a popular tourism area, with many different individual historical and natural sites and attractions. Sintra and Cascais are towns and municipalities in the Lisbon / Estoril Coast.

Attractions within the Park
Anta de Adrenunes
Azenhas do Mar
Cabo da Roca
Castle of the Moors
Chalet and Garden of the Countess of Edla
Convent of the Capuchos (Sintra) (Convent of the Friars Minor Capuchin)
Cresmina Dune
Palace of Sintra
Pena Palace
Praia do Guincho (Guincho Beach)
Monserrate Palace
Quinta da Regaleira
Quinta da Ribafria
Ramalhão Palace
Sanctuary of Peninha
Seteais Palace

Photo Gallery

References

External links
 Official Site at the (Portuguese) Institute for Nature Conservation (Portuguese language)

Nature conservation in Portugal
Nature parks in Portugal
Protected areas established in 1981
Geography of Lisbon District
Tourist attractions in Lisbon District
Cascais
Natura 2000 in Portugal